Shannon Michelle Parry  (born 27 October 1989) is an Australian female rugby union player. She won a gold medal at the 2016 Summer Olympics in Rio.

She was in the squad to the 2013 Rugby World Cup Sevens as defending champions.

Parry was in 's 2014 Women's Rugby World Cup squad. She was co-captain of Australia's team at the 2016 Olympics, defeating New Zealand in the final to win the inaugural Olympic gold medal in the sport. In 2017 Parry was named Captain of the Female Australian 15 Player Squad.

Parry was named in the Australia squad for the Rugby sevens at the 2020 Summer Olympics. The team came second in the pool round but then lost to Fiji 14-12 in the quarterfinals.

Parry was named in Australia's squad for the 2022 Pacific Four Series in New Zealand. She then made the Wallaroos squad for a two-test series against the Black Ferns at the Laurie O'Reilly Cup. She was selected in the team again for the delayed 2022 Rugby World Cup in New Zealand.

References

External links
 
 
 Wallaroos Profile

1989 births
Living people
Australia women's international rugby union players
Australian female rugby union players
Australian female rugby sevens players
Rugby sevens players at the 2016 Summer Olympics
Olympic rugby sevens players of Australia
Olympic gold medalists for Australia
Olympic medalists in rugby sevens
Medalists at the 2016 Summer Olympics
Australia international rugby sevens players
Commonwealth Games medallists in rugby sevens
Commonwealth Games silver medallists for Australia
Rugby sevens players at the 2018 Commonwealth Games
Recipients of the Medal of the Order of Australia
Rugby sevens players at the 2020 Summer Olympics
Medallists at the 2018 Commonwealth Games